Wang Haijian (born 2 August 2000) is a Chinese footballer currently playing as a midfielder for Shanghai Shenhua.

Club career
Wang Haijian would play for the Shanghai Shenhua youth team before being promoted to the senior team at the beginning of the 2019 Chinese Super League season and would go on to make his debut in a Chinese FA Cup game on 24 July 2019 in a 3-1 victory against Tianjin TEDA.

Career statistics

Honours

Club
Shanghai Shenhua
Chinese FA Cup: 2019

References

External links

2000 births
Living people
Chinese footballers
Association football midfielders
Shanghai Shenhua F.C. players